Balladyna may refer to:

 Balladyna (drama), an 1834 tragedy by Juliusz Słowacki
 Balladyna (album), a 1975 album by Tomasz Stańko
 Balladyna (film), a 2009 thriller starring Faye Dunaway